The 1963 Liège–Bastogne–Liège was the 49th edition of the Liège–Bastogne–Liège cycle race and was held on 5 May 1963. The race started and finished in Liège. The race was won by Frans Melckenbeeck of the Mercier team.

General classification

References

1963
1963 in Belgian sport